was the commissioner for the Nippon Professional Baseball league. He had served as the Commissioner of Baseball (NPB) since 2014. He had handed out punishments for many reasons including gambling.  He had been key in the return of baseball to the 2020 Olympics.

References

1942 births
2022 deaths
Nippon Professional Baseball commissioners
Meiji University alumni